is a passenger railway station in located in the city of Higashikurume, Tokyo, Japan, operated by the private railway operator Seibu Railway.

Lines

Station layout
The station has two ground-level side platforms serving two tracks.

The "Emio Higashi-Kurume" shopping and eating complex opened in 2010. The station building includes lavatories for men and women and a wheelchair-accessible multi-purpose restroom.

Platforms

History
Higashi-Kurume Station opened on 15 April 1915. It was named Higashi-Kurume to avoid confusion with Kurume Station in Kyushu.

The station was rebuilt in 1994 with a new structure spanning the tracks and platforms.

The "Emio Higashi-Kurume" station complex opened in 2010.

Station numbering was introduced on all Seibu Railway lines during fiscal 2012, with Higashi-Kurume Station becoming "SI14".

Passenger statistics
In fiscal 2019, the station was the 16th busiest on the Seibu network with an average of 54,968 passengers daily. 

The passenger figures for previous years are as shown below.

Surrounding area
 Higashikurume City Office
 Higashikurume Fire Station
 Higashikurumeshi Chikurin Park

See also
List of railway stations in Japan

References

External links

 Higashi-Kurume Station information (Seibu Railway) 

Railway stations in Japan opened in 1915
Seibu Ikebukuro Line
Railway stations in Tokyo
Higashikurume, Tokyo